AOM French Airlines (previously Air Outre-Mer) was the second-largest airline in France from 1990 until 2001. Its head office was in Building 363 at Orly Airport, Paray-Vieille-Poste.

History

Air Outre Mer (AOM) was founded in 1988 in the French overseas département of the island of Réunion and began scheduled passenger service in 1990 with a McDonnell Douglas DC-10-30 and a Dornier Dornier 228. In October 1991, Air Outre Mer  merged with Air Minerve, a French airline which was based at Orly and had operated since 1975. The two companies began operating under the name AOM French Airlines although the administrative name was "AOM-Minerve S.A.". Air Minerve was the first airline to compete directly with Air Inter on the French domestic airline market by opening a Paris (Orly) - Nice route in May 1990. In February 1999, Swissair acquired a 49% stake in the airline as a part of its "hunter strategy".
For most of the decade, the airline fiercely competed with Air France on both the French domestic market and on the air routes to the French overseas territories. Due to inappropriate fleet management and  overcapacity, the airline quickly accumulated huge debts and consequently ceased operations in 2001 (possibly as a result of the bursting of the dot-com bubble and the early 2000s recession which followed). The airline's final bankruptcy was approved after several months of strikes.

On 25 March 2001 AOM French Airlines merged with Air Liberté, the airline retaining the name "Air Liberté". On 22 September 2001 the airline was renamed "Air Lib".{Wikipedia French article}.

AOM's disappearance was followed by several other French airlines such as Aeris, Air Littoral, Euralair and Star Airlines (later XL Airways France) in the next several years, leaving Air France and Corsair International as the two largest remaining airlines in France at the time.

Destinations

France
 Marseille (Marseille Provence Airport)
 Nice (Côte d'Azur International Airport)
 Paris (Paris Orly Airport)
 Perpignan (Llabanère Airport)
 Toulon (Toulon-Hyères Airport)

French overseas departments and territories
 French Guiana
 Cayenne (Cayenne-Rochambeau Airport)
 Guadeloupe
 Pointe-à-Pitre (Pointe-à-Pitre International Airport)
 Saint Martin (Princess Juliana International Airport)
 Martinique
 Fort-de-France (Le Lamentin Airport)
 New Caledonia
 Nouméa (La Tontouta International Airport)
 Réunion
 Saint-Denis (Roland Garros Airport)
 Tahiti
 Papeete (Faa'a International Airport)

International routes

 Sydney (Sydney Airport) (Paris-Colombo-Sydney-Nouméa from November 1995, ceased 2001.)

 Nassau (Lynden Pindling International Airport)

 Havana (José Martí International Airport)
 Varadero (Juan Gualberto Gómez Airport)

 Punta Cana (Punta Cana International Airport)

 Quito (Mariscal Sucre International Airport)

 Tokyo (Narita International Airport)

 Tripoli (Tripoli International Airport)

 Malé (Velana International Airport)

 Colombo (Bandaranaike International Airport) (Paris-Colombo-Sydney-Nouméa from November 1995, ceased 2001.)

 Zürich (Zürich Airport)

 Bangkok (Don Mueang International Airport) (Paris-Bangkok-Nouméa, until November 1995.) 

 Los Angeles (Los Angeles International Airport)

 Ho Chi Minh City (Tan Son Nhat International Airport)

Fleet
The AOM French Airlines fleet included the following equipment:

Accidents and incidents
Cubana de Aviación Flight 1216: On December 21, 1999, a Cubana de Aviación McDonnell Douglas DC-10-30 (F-GTDI) on lease from AOM on an international non-scheduled passenger flight from Havana (José Martí International Airport) suffered a landing accident at Guatemala City (La Aurora Airport), Guatemala. The aircraft overran runway 19 and continued down a steep slope before coming to rest in a residential area. 8 of the 296 passengers and 8 of the 18 crew as well as 2 people on the ground were killed and the aircraft written off. The Guatemalan Dirección General de Aeronáutica Civil investigated the accident.

References

External links

AOM French Airlines (Archive) 
Air Outre-Mer at the Aviation Safety Network Database
Defunct airlines at http://www.aviationexplorer.com
AOM French Airlines at https://web.archive.org/web/20120412013004/http://www.rati.com/

 https://aviation-safety.net/database/record.php?id=19991221-0

Defunct airlines of France
Airlines established in 1988
Airlines disestablished in 2001